Born to Buy: The Commercialized Child and the New Consumer Culture is a 2004 book by Juliet Schor on consumerist targeting of children.

Bibliography

External links 

 
 Full text from the Internet Archive

2004 non-fiction books
English-language books
Simon & Schuster books
Consumerism
Books by Juliet Schor